The Trans European Policy Studies Association (TEPSA) is a European network of research institutes and think-tanks in the field of European affairs. Founded in 1974, it is an international nonprofit association under Belgian law with 44 member organisations in 37 different European countries, and an office in Brussels.

History 
TEPSA was founded in 1974 by four research institutes: the Institut für Europaische Politik (Germany), the Istituto Affari Internazionali (Italy), the Federal Trust for Education and Research (UK) and the Association Française pour l’Etude de l’Union Européenne (France). In 1978, upon the accession of its Belgian member, Prof. Jacques Vandamme, former adviser to Belgian Prime minister Leo Tindemans, was designated president of the association.
TEPSA progressively extended its membership to 20 institutes in the year 2000. In 2016, full membership was opened to organizations from all European countries outside the European Union, allowing TEPSA to expand to 38 members in 2017. The current Chairman of the TEPSA board is Prof.  (University of Duisburg-Essen), succeeding to Prof. Wolfgang Wessels (University of Cologne).

In 2016, TEPSA was ranked as 12th best think-tank network by the University of Pennsylvania’s Global Go To Think Tank Index Report, an annual ranking of the world’s best think-tanks.

Aims and activities 
TEPSA aims at maintaining a stable framework for transnational research cooperation in the field of European affairs, and providing new opportunities for academics and students in the field, mainly through EU-funded research and education projects. With one member in each EU country and members in EFTA, Eastern Neighborhood and candidate countries, but also a number of associate members, TEPSA seeks to stimulate discussion on policy options for Europe by bringing together academics and students from across the continent, and connecting them with practitioners and policymakers.

Since its founding in 1974, TEPSA organises a conference twice a year with academics and policymakers on the agenda of the upcoming presidency of the Council of the European Union (the Pre-Presidency Conference), where it delivers a set of recommendations to representatives of the presiding member state. The conference is jointly organised with and hosted by the member organisation in the concerned country.

TEPSA also regularly delivers its members' expertise to the European Parliament in briefings and studies.

TEPSA members

Full members

Associate members

Governance

Board members

Honorary board members

References 

International organisations based in Belgium